The National Property Administration (FNP) is the agency of the Ministry of Finance of  Taiwan (ROC) responsible for the management of national property.

History
The FNP was established on 12 December 1960 by the Organic Regulations for National Property Administration which was approved by the Executive Yuan on 24 November 1960.

Responsibilities
 Inspections of national property
 Management of national property
 Disposal of national property
 Improved utilization of national property
 Transactions of national property information
 Investigations, coordination and allocation of national property
 Assessment of national property
 Consultation and management of regulations and legal cases of national property
 Other national property related issues

Organizational structure
 Take Over and Custody Division
 Management and Disposal Division
 Development Division
 Public Assets Management Division
 Office of Computer Information
 Secretariat
 Office of Accountants
 Office of Personnel Affairs
 Civil Service Ethics Office
 Office of Law Affairs

Transportation
NTA is accessible within walking distance North West of Sun Yat-sen Memorial Hall Station of the Taipei Metro.

See also
 Ministry of Finance (Taiwan)

References

External links

 

1960 establishments in Taiwan
Executive Yuan
Government agencies established in 1960
Government of Taiwan